Caresus or Karesos was a town of the ancient Troad, on a river of the same name, in a mountainous tract called the Caresene. It was ruined before Strabo's time.

Its site is unlocated.

References

Populated places in ancient Troad
Former populated places in Turkey